Salem Township is located in Marion County, Illinois. As of the 2010 census, its population was 9,286 and it contained 4,225 housing units.

Geography 
Salem Township (T2N R2E) is centered at 38°36'N 88°59'W (38.619, -88.980). It is traversed north–south by Interstate Route 57 and State Route 37 and east–west by U.S. Route 50. The city of Salem is located in the northeastern part of the township as is most of the Salem Reservoir (El. 166 m).

Demographics

Adjacent townships 
 Tonti Township (north)
 Alma Township (northeast)
 Stevenson Township (east)
 Haines Township (southeast)
 Raccoon Township (south)
 Centralia Township (southwest)
 Odin Township (west)
 Carrigan Township, Marion County (northwest)

References

External links
US Census
City-data.com
Illinois State Archives

Townships in Marion County, Illinois
Townships in Illinois